The Musgrave rifles are a series of bolt-action target and hunting rifles produced in South Africa.

These guns have their roots in target shooting and were designed for full-bore target shooters in an era when surplus war rifles such as the Lee–Enfield, Lee–Metford, P14 and others were used. The Musgrave facility (located in Bloemfontein, Republic of South Africa) where they were built housed a giant gunsmithing concern. RSA actions and earlier hammer-forged barrels were manufactured at Lyttelton Engineering Works.

By 1989, Musgrave employed 220 people and produced 6,000 hunting rifles per year over a ten model range. Musgrave's product range diversified to include shotguns, sporting equipment, fuel locking devices and other items.

Though Musgrave was an ARMSCOR subsidiary since 1971, the name finally disappeared under Denel control in August 1996. The end of this era came about when Musgrave's Bloemfontein facility was closed down and some of the equipment and personnel relocated to Lyttelton Engineering Works where hunting rifles under the "Vektor" (Vector) name were built for a short while, alongside the R4 assault rifle, Z88 pistol and other small armament which forms DENEL's main focus.

The dormant Musgrave name was revived by a private owner and new semi-custom built Musgrave rifles from the town of Ermelo, Mpumalanga, RSA entered the market.

The Musgrave RSA Target Rifle

The single-shot Musgrave RSA action (sometimes marked "Lyttelton RSA") is based on Mauser's design and feature a controlled feed (claw) extractor. The actions have a large flat bedding area underneath and a short case extraction port. The original Musgrave target rifles were fitted with 26.5" barrels and designated "7,62" (7.62×51mm NATO or .308 Winchester).

The top part of the fitted hammer forged barrels (until c. 1975) from Lyttleton, were encased by a handguard, while M&S 1/3 MOA rear sights were installed. Parker Hale 1/4 MOA rear sights were available as an option. Stocks were made of a dense and strong beech wood. The handguard is absent from later models, which had significantly bulkier fore-ends to allow for an open barrel with effective cooling while still reducing potential fliers due to contact between the free floated barrel and the shooter's fingers. Accurate Musgrave-manufactured button rifled barrels (with a slightly longer, parallel nox) were usually matched with these stocks.

Musgraves were proofed by a recognised Proof-House. The SABS (South African Bureau of Standards) stamped the metalwork on a proofed rifle with two proofmarks in the shape of a capital letter "T" within "Springbok horns", one on the action (receiver), the other on the barrel.

A SABS inspector fired a high pressure round through every rifle manufactured on Musgrave's site and signed off. Musgrave's quality control department did a rigorous functional test on every rifle, testing the trigger, safety catch, firing pin protrusion, extractor and headspace against strict standards while evaluating the rifle's accuracy.
 
The South African Bisley Union site states:
"With the advent of the new RSA rifle and thanks to better sporting-type rifles in general, which were used for the first time in South Africa during the 1971 National Championships at Cape Town, record totals began tumbling headlong. In 1972 South Africa, shooting in Salisbury, shattered the spectacular Rhodes Centenary Match record of 1845 points by a staggering 81 points."

Musgrave hunting rifles
Surplus rifle conversions
Many .303 rifles were available in South Africa after the 2nd Anglo-Boer war, and conversions of these were used as hunting rifles. For plains game, a flatter shooting alternative was found in 6 mm Musgrave.

Production Rifles

Features highlighted below as characteristics of the various models are not exclusive, as many variants exist.

Three models of Musgrave hunting rifles for which the RSA action served as platform were manufactured from 29 May 1970, namely the
"Veld Model"
"Vrystaat Model" (Mk I)
"Presidents Model" (Mk II)

Several other models followed, including:
Mk III & Mk IV (Mod 98 based Santa Barbara actions and barrels - Serial numbers start with "R-")
LP 1000s 
Mod 80     
Mod 83    
K98        
Various Mod 90s      
Mod 2000
Afrika (Standard, De Lux and Supreme)

Musgrave built three exhibition rifles by hand for display in the USA (1983-1984) with the following serial numbers:
XMA001 – Supreme Grade
XMA002 – Custom Grade
XMA003 – Standard Grade
These were polished Mod 90 actions, engraved by Armin Winkler with gold triggers on French walnut stocks, fore ends tipped with buffalo horn and fitted with express sights. Two additional front sights (drop compensated) came in a hidden compartment in the pistol grip.

.22 Rimfire
Ambidex (Straight-pull action with bolt handle which can be reassembled to accommodate left-handed shooters)

Some Musgraves were exported to Europe and the US, either as complete rifles or components.

Shotguns
Over and under: Some Beretta components used - similar to the Beretta 686 O/U shotguns.
Pump Action: Musgrave 12, similar to the Beretta RS 200, also a version for the South African Police Force.
Semi-Auto: Essentially a Musgrave-barrelled Beretta A300.

Musgrave pistols
Pistols built by Musgrave include:

 Varan PMX-80
 Musgrave Pistol

Semi-automatic rifles
LM4
Musgrave .223 AR15

References

External links
 
 

Rifles of South Africa